Nectophrynoides is a genus of true toads, family Bufonidae. They are endemic to Eastern Arc forests and wetlands in Tanzania, and all except N. tornieri are threatened. Species of the genus are ovoviviparous: fertilization is internal, and the females give birth to fully developed, small toadlets. Together with the West Africa Nimbaphrynoides (which was included in Nectophrynoides in the past) and Limnonectes larvaepartus, they are the only frogs/toads in the world that do not lay eggs. The Ethiopian Altiphrynoides (includes Spinophrynoides), which lay eggs, were also part of Nectophrynoides in the past.

Species
The genus Nectophrynoides contains 13 accepted species.

References

External links

 
Amphibian genera
Frogs of Africa
Endemic fauna of Tanzania
Taxa named by Gladwyn Kingsley Noble